The Association for the Study of Animal Behaviour (ASAB) is a British organization founded in 1936 to promote ethology, and the study of animal behaviour. ASAB holds conferences, offers grants, and publishes a peer-reviewed journal, Animal Behaviour, first published in 1953. ASAB also runs a certification scheme so the public are able to seek advice about companion animals from appropriately qualified and experienced behaviourists (‘CCABs’).

ASAB further recognises excellence in teaching and research with awards including the ASAB medal and Christopher Barnard Award. The annual Tinbergen Lecturer is invited by ASAB Council, and gives an invited presentation at the ASAB Winter Meeting held in London each year.

ASAB was founded in London on 13 March 1936 as the Institute for the Study of Animal Behaviour. Julian Huxley was the first president and Solly Zuckerman the first editor of its earlier publication, Bulletin of Animal Behaviour, which began publishing in October 1938. Other past presidents include Geoffrey Matthews (1971–1974) and Christopher J. Barnard (2004–2007) and Jane Hurst.

Pat Monaghan, Regius Professor of Zoology at the University of Glasgow, is President of the ASAB Council as of October 2017.

ASAB organises 3 conferences a year (Spring, Summer, and Winter), typically held in the UK.

References

Ethology
Scientific organizations established in 1936